Proculus (died c. 281) was a Roman usurper, one of the "minor pretenders" according to Historia Augusta, who would have taken the purple against Emperor Probus in 280. This is now disputed.

Probably Proculus had family connection with the Franks, to whom he turned in vain when his bid for imperial power was failing. He was a native of Albingaunum (modern Albenga in Liguria in north-west Italy). Though he was accounted a noble, his ancestors had been brigands and were the source of his vast wealth. Proculus was able to arm 2000 slaves of his own latifundia after seizing imperial office in the West. He was married to a woman named Vituriga, who was given the nickname "Samso" for her capabilities (considered "unwomanly" by the fourth century author of Historia Augusta), and at the time of his usurpation,  he had one son, Herennianus, aged four.

Proculus was an ambitious soldier, who had commanded more than one legion as tribune; when in 280 he was asked by the people of Lugdunum (Lyon) who had started a rebellion against Emperor Probus to take the purple, he accepted, proclaiming himself joint emperor with Bonosus. "He was, nevertheless, of some benefit to the Gauls, for he crushed the Alamanni — who then were still called Germans — and not without illustrious glory, though he never fought save in brigand-fashion" (Historia Augusta)

On his return from fighting the Sassanids in Syria, Probus forced Proculus to retreat north. After failing to find support among the Franks, he was betrayed by them and handed over to Probus. Probus had Proculus killed (ca. 281), but spared his family " with his accustomed moderation, and spared the fortunes as well as the lives of their innocent families," (Gibbon, I.12) who remained at Albingaunum, declaring, according to Historia Augusta, that they wished neither to be princes nor brigands.

There exists a letter by Proculus that was cited by Gibbon and that is perhaps fictitious, but notable regardless. It begins with an apparent boast about his sexual prowess: "From Proculus to his kinsman Maecianus, greeting. I have taken one hundred maidens from Sarmatia. Of these I mated with ten in a single night..." Gibbon comments of Proculus and his co-usurper Bosunus, a heavy drinker, that the "distinguished merit of those two officers was their respective prowess, of the one in the combats of Bacchus, of the other in those of Venus".

Notes

References
Roman Emperors: Probus and rival claimants: drawing on Historia Augusta (bibliography)
Historia Augusta: Lives of Firmus, Saturninus, Proculus and Bonosus
Smith, Dictionary of Greek and Roman Biography and Mythography: "Proculus" gives numerous others with this cognomen.
 Edward Gibbon, Decline and Fall of the Roman Empire vol. I. chapter 12

3rd-century births
281 deaths
3rd-century Roman usurpers
Crisis of the Third Century
Executed ancient Roman people
People executed by the Roman Empire
3rd-century executions
People from Albenga
Executed Italian people
Romans from unknown gentes
Ancient Roman generals
Generals of Probus